Hintlesham Woods is a  biological Site of Special Scientific Interest east of Hadleigh in Suffolk. Part of it is Wolves Wood, which is managed by the Royal Society for the Protection of Birds.

These ancient coppice with standards woods are mainly oak with some ash and birch. The soils are boulder clay, which is covered in some areas with glacial sands. Ground flora includes green hellebore, birds-nest orchid and wood spurge.

There are several kinds of woods in two blocks. There is access to footpaths in Wolves Wood and Ramsey Wood, but other areas are private property with no public access.

References

Sites of Special Scientific Interest in Suffolk
Nature Conservation Review sites
Babergh District